Goatacara boliviana is a species of beetle in the family Cerambycidae, the only species in the genus Goatacara.

References

Compsocerini